Weller Township is one of the eighteen townships of Richland County, Ohio, United States.  It is a part of the Mansfield Metropolitan Statistical Area.  The 2000 census found 1,736 people in the township.

Geography
Located in the northeastern part of the county, it borders the following townships:
Butler Township - north
Clear Creek Township, Ashland County - northeast corner
Milton Township, Ashland County - east
Mifflin Township - southeast
Madison Township - southwest
Franklin Township - west
Blooming Grove Township - northwest corner

No municipalities are located in Weller Township, although the unincorporated community of Olivesburg lies in the northeastern part of the township.

Name and history
It is the only Weller Township statewide. After the formation of Ashland County in 1846, a few years later Weller Township was formed. The eastern half of Weller County was formed from the western two columns of sections of Milton Township which remained in Richland County. The western half of Weller Township was also composed of two columns of sections, gained from old Franklin Township, which combined to give Weller Township its present dimensions -- four by six miles.

Township Website

Government
The township is governed by a three-member board of trustees, who are elected in November of odd-numbered years to a four-year term beginning on the following January 1. Two are elected in the year after the presidential election and one is elected in the year before it. There is also an elected township fiscal officer, who serves a four-year term beginning on April 1 of the year after the election, which is held in November of the year before the presidential election. Vacancies in the fiscal officership or on the board of trustees are filled by the remaining trustees.

References

External links
County website
Township Website

Townships in Richland County, Ohio
Townships in Ohio